Hideo Yamamoto is the name of:

Hideo Yamamoto, Japanese manga artist
Hideo Yamamoto (karateka), Japanese karate master and former world champion